The Stone: Issue Two is a 2007 live album of improvised experimental music by Fred Frith and Chris Cutler. It was recorded at The Stone in New York City on 15 December 2006 and was one of four CDs released between 2006 and 2010 by Tzadik Records to raise funds for The Stone. It was Frith and Cutler's fourth collaborative album.

The Stone Benefit series
All titles released by Tzadik Records.
The Stone: Issue One (2006) – John Zorn, Dave Douglas, Rob Burger, Bill Laswell, Mike Patton and Ben Perowsky
The Stone: Issue Two (2007) – Fred Frith and Chris Cutler
The Stone: Issue Three (2008) – John Zorn, Lou Reed and Laurie Anderson
The Stone: Issue Four (2010) – Chris Wood, Billy Martin and John Medeski

Background
Frith and Cutler were members of the English avant-rock group Henry Cow (1968–1978), and their collaboration at The Stone on 15 December 2006 took place during the so-called "Henry Cow reunion" weekend when they reunited with bandmate Tim Hodgkinson.

Reception

In a review of The Stone: Issue Two at AllMusic, Michael G. Nastos described Cutler's performance as "intriguing" "electronic colorations", and Frith's as "challenging, commanding, and demonstrative". He said this is a recording that careful listening to will demonstrate "the sense of passion, wonder, and depth these two have displayed in their music since their days with Henry Cow, but digging deeper than ever".

Marc Medwin wrote in a review in All About Jazz that compared to Frith and Cutler's earlier collaborations, this set is "rich and full" and makes it sound like there are more than just two of them. Medwin added that this album is a worthy addition to The Stone's benefit series.

Reviewing the album in The Wire, Barry Witherden described the music as "fascinating, bemusing, hypnotic, seductive, sometimes disturbing, sometimes consoling, sometimes chaotic, ultimately revealing a mysterious, elemental beauty". He said one of the joys of listening to "sound-sculpting" like this is "trying to work out ... not only who plays what but how the sounds are created". Witherden stated that what makes this album work is Frith and Cutler's "imagination and control of design, trajectory and texture".

Track listing

Sources: Liner notes, Discogs, Fred Frith discography.

Personnel
Fred Frith – guitars
Chris Cutler – drums, detritus, electronics

Sources: Liner notes, Discogs, Fred Frith discography.

Sound and artwork
Recorded by Robert O'Haire
Mastered by Scott Hull
Produced by John Zorn
Photography by Scott Friedlander
Designed by Heung-Heung Chin

Sources: Liner notes, Discogs, Fred Frith discography.

Notes

References

2007 live albums
Collaborative albums
Experimental music albums by English artists
Live free improvisation albums
Fred Frith live albums
Chris Cutler live albums
Albums produced by John Zorn
Tzadik Records live albums